The Complete Solid State Recordings of the Thad Jones/Mel Lewis Orchestra is a Mosaic Records limited edition compilation of all previously released songs from the five Solid State Records (later Blue Note) instrumental releases of the Thad Jones/Mel Lewis Jazz Orchestra.   Several unissued and/or alternate takes from the original album recording sessions are also included as well as two songs previously released only as a single.

Track listing 
CD 1
 "ABC Blues"  
 "Kids Are Pretty People"
 "Don’t Ever Leave Me" 
 "Once Around" 
 "Three And One"  
 "Balanced Scales = Justice"  
 "Willow Weep For Me"  
 "Mean What You Say"  
 "Sophisticated Lady"  
 "Willow Tree" 
 "Hawaii" 

CD 2 
 "The Little Pixie" 
 "A- That’s Freedom" 
 "The Second Race"
 "Willow Tree"  
 "Quietude"
 "Bachafillen" 
 "Lover Man" 
 "Mornin’ Reverend" 

CD 3
 "Samba Con Getchu" 
 "Willow Tree"
 "Don’t Git Sassy" 
 "Say It Softly" 
 "Mornin’ Reverend" 
 "Kids Are Pretty People" 
 "The Second Race" 

CD 4  
 "St. Louis Blues" 
 "The Waltz You Swang For Me" 
 "Central Park North"  
 "Jive Samba"  
 "Quietude" 
 "Big Dipper" 
 "Tow Away Zone" 
 "The Groove Merchant" 

CD 5
 "Consummation" 
 "Dedication"  
 "Tiptoe"  
 "It Only Happens Every Time"  
 "Fingers"  
 "Us"  
 "A Child Is Born"  
 "Ahunk Ahunk"

Personnel 
See personnel listing of original recordings:

References 

 Mosaic	MD5-151 (5 CDs), Mosaic MR7-151 (7 LPs)
 Yanow, Scott, AllMusic.com 

1994 compilation albums
The Thad Jones/Mel Lewis Orchestra compilation albums